This is a list of notable past and present people from the City of Frankston in Melbourne, Victoria, Australia. It incorporates the City of Frankston localities and suburbs of Carrum Downs, Frankston, Frankston East, Frankston Heights, Frankston North, Frankston South, Kananook, Karingal, Langwarrin, Langwarrin South, Long Island, Mount Erin, Olivers Hill, Sandhurst, Seaford and Skye. The demonym for a person from Frankston is a "Frankstonian".

Arts
Rick Amor – painter and sculptor
William Leslie Bowles – sculptor and medallist
Raymond Boultwood Ewers – sculptor
Walter Langcake – sculptor and woodturner
Sir Daryl Lindsay – painter and Director of the National Gallery of Victoria from 1942 to 1956 (lived at Mulberry Hill in Langwarrin South)
Richard Linton – painter, studio was formerly located in Frankston Central Business District (CBD) and is now just south of it at the Morningstar Estate vineyard

Business and society
Dame Beryl Beaurepaire AC DBE – philanthropist and women's rights campaigner
Anthony Di Pietro – businessman and Chairman of Melbourne Victory FC from 2011–present
Sir Laurence Hartnett CBE – automotive pioneer, known as the "father of Holden" (Hartnett Drive in Seaford is named in his honour)
Sir John Holland, AC – philanthropist, engineering and construction magnate; founder of John Holland Group
Josiah Humphrey – co-founder and CEO of failed app development company Appster 
Wilbraham Liardet – early Melbourne pioneer (lived at Ballam Park in Karingal)
Anthony JJ Lucas – philanthropist, businessman and the Consulate-General of Greece in Australia from 1931 to 1946 (lived at Yamala in Frankston)
Dame Elisabeth Murdoch AC DBE – philanthropist; mother of international media magnate Rupert Murdoch (lived at Cruden Farm in Langwarrin)
Charles Wedge – early Frankston settler (Wedge Road in Carrum Downs is named in his honour)

Entertainment

Actors
Kaarin Fairfax – actor and director, founder of the Little Theatre in Frankston
Jackie Woodburne – actor, best known for playing Susan Kennedy in Neighbours, 1994–current
Dougie Baldwin – actor, best known for his roles in Australian television shows Nowhere Boys and Upper Middle Bogan, also the Netflix show Disjointed.
Sam Humphrey – actor, best known for playing Charles Stratton in the 2017 film The Greatest Showman
Malcolm Kennard – Australian actor with many credits including the role of Ivan Milat in the mini series, Catching Milat.

Authors
Don Charlwood AM – author
Paul Jennings AM – children's author
Lady Joan Lindsay – author of Picnic at Hanging Rock, made into a film by the same name in 1975 (lived at Mulberry Hill in Langwarrin South)
Myra Morris – children's author and poet
Nevil Shute – author of On the Beach, which was partly set in Frankston, and later made into a film by the same name in 1959

Media
Graham Kennedy AO – television personality, known as the "King of Australian television"
Mick Malloy – Australian comedian, writer, producer, actor, television and radio presenter who moved to Frankston from the ACT. Many Frankstonians may remember him working on the door of the 21st Century Dance Club in addition to his TV, Radio and Comedy.
Peter Mitchell – journalist, currently the Melbourne news presenter for Seven News
Mal Walden – veteran journalist, former Melbourne news presenter for Ten News

Musicians
Gil Askey – American jazz trumpeter, known as one of the original "architects of the Motown sound"
Vera Bradford – classical pianist, founded the Frankston Symphony Orchestra in 1968, and gifted the "Vera Bradford Music Collection" to the Monash University, Peninsula campus
Cheyne Coates – singer, formerly with ARIA Music Award-winning band Madison Avenue
Carl Cox – British DJ, 1997 #1 DJ in the world (lives on Olivers Hill when in Australia)
Jay Dunne – lead singer with the hip hop/punk band 28 Days
Lee Harding – singer, placed third on the third series of Australian Idol
Simon Hepburn – songwriter and lead guitarist with the hip hop/punk band 28 Days
Sammy J - comedic musician, born in Frankston, best known for Randy & Sammy J.
Johnny Logan – currently Ireland-based singer; only soloist to have won the Eurovision Song Contest twice (1980 & 1987)
Toby Martin – songwriter and lead singer of the ARIA Music Award-winning rock band Youth Group
Kathleen McGuire – orchestra conductor, composer and activist 
Ryan Monro – bassist with the ARIA Music Award-winning jazz/ska band The Cat Empire
Alasdair Murray – ARIA Music Award-winning rapper and recording artist known as "Illy"
Dw Norton – ARIA Award-nominated record producer known as "dw Norton", founder and guitarist with the nu-metal band Superheist
Michael Paynter – singer, made the top 16 on second season of The Voice Australia
Matt Rizzo - drummer, Rizzo has spent most of his life in Frankston. Previous bands include Blood Duster and King Parrot and now plays for Frankston band, Womb to Tomb
Brad Robinson – lead guitarist with the rock band Australian Crawl
Dutch Tilders – blues singer, known as the "godfather of Australian blues"
Andy Van Dorsselaer – ARIA Music Award-winning record producer known as "Andy Van", formerly with the band Madison Avenue, and co-founder of the record label Vicious Vinyl
Toni Watson – known professionally as Tones and I, is an Australian singer and songwriter. Her second single, "Dance Monkey", was released in May 2019 and reached number one in over 30 countries.
Nathaniel Willemse – Known simply as Nathaniel, he is a South African-born Australian singer and songwriter most notable for finishing sixth on the fourth season of The X Factor Australia.

Music groups formed in the City of Frankston 
Australian Welsh Male Choir
The Basics
Defryme
Deloris
Eddy Current Suppression Ring
Frankston Symphony Orchestra
Madison Avenue
Superheist

Government

Politics
Hon. Austin Asche AC QC – 3rd Chief Justice of the Supreme Court of the Northern Territory from 1987 to 1993 and the 13th Administrator of the Northern Territory from 1993 to 1997
The Hon. Bruce Billson – Member of the Parliament of Australia representing the Division of Dunkley from 1996 to 2016 and Minister for Small Business
The Hon. General Sir Dallas Brooks GCMG KCB KCVO DSO KStJ – 19th Governor of Victoria from 1949 to 1963, and the General of the Royal Marines from 1945 to 1949
The Rt Hon. Lord Stanley Bruce, CH, MC, FRS, PC – 8th Prime Minister of Australia from 1923 to 1929 (lived at Bruce Manor in Frankston, before moving to The Lodge in Canberra)
Sir Harold W. Clapp, KBE – Victorian Railways Chairman of Commissioners from 1920 to 1939
Chris Crewther, – Former Member of the Parliament of Australia for the Division of Dunkley from 2016 to 2019.
The Hon. James Fenton CMG – Postmaster-General of Australia (precursor to Minister for Communications), oversaw establishment of the Australian Broadcasting Corporation in 1932
The Hon. Sir Rupert Hamer, AC KCMG ED – 39th Premier of Victoria from 1972 to 1981, anti-discrimination and environmental campaigner
The Hon. Jeff Kennett, AC – 43rd Premier of Victoria from 1992 to 1999, mental health campaigner and media commentator
Sir John Madden, GCMG – 4th Chief Justice of the Supreme Court of Victoria from 1893 to 1918 and Lieutenant Governor of Victoria from 1893 to 1913 (lived at Yamala in Frankston)
Jim Plowman – 28th and 32nd Speaker of the Victorian Legislative Assembly 
Tony Simpson – Member of the Parliament of Western Australia, representing the District of Darling Range from 2005–present

Military
Rear Admiral William Carr, CBE – Surgeon and Medical Services Director of the Royal Australian Navy from 1932 to 1946
Grp Captain Charles Eaton, OBE, AFC – Royal Australian Air Force aviator in World War I and II, and the Consulate-General of Australia in the Dutch East Indies from 1946 to 1951
Major General Harold Grimwade, CB, CMG – Commander of the Australian Military Forces, 4th Division, from 1926 to 1930, and businessman (lived at Marathon in Frankston) 
Lieutenant General Sir Vernon Sturdee, KBE, CB, DSO – Chief of the Australian Army from 1945 to 1950 and the Australian commander of the Commonwealth Force in occupied Japan

Health and medicine
Dr Ruth Bishop, AO – virologist, discovered the rotavirus in 1973
Prof. Max Coltheart – cognitive scientist and Emeritus Professor in the Department of Cognitive Science at Macquarie University

Sports

All codes/types
David Andersen – basketball #3199 formerly with the US NBA, played with the Australian national basketball team at three Olympic Games (Athens 2004, Beijing 2008, London 2012)
Ryan Broekhoff – basketballer, #3199 named Player of the Year and an Honorary All-American in 2012 while playing US college basketball with Valparaiso University
Benjamin Burge – sports shooter, Manchester 2002 and Melbourne 2006 Commonwealth Games and Beijing 2008 Olympic Games medallist
Ellie Cole – swimmer, Beijing 2008 Paralympics and Delhi 2010 Commonwealth Games medallist
John Conway – cricketer and journalist, organised the first ever tour of England by the Australian cricket team in 1878
Taz Douglas – V8 Supercars race driver
Johnny Famechon – boxer, 1969 World Featherweight Champion and World Boxing Hall of Fame inductee
Debbie Flintoff-King, OAM – hurdler, Brisbane 1982 Commonwealth Games and Seoul 1988 Olympic Games gold medallist 
Sara Klein - athlete, represented Australia at Commonwealth Games (Glasgow 2014)
Craig Mottram – athlete, represented Australia at three Olympic Games (Sydney 2000, Athens 2004, Beijing 2008)
Desmond Piper – hockey player with the Australian national hockey team at three Olympic Games (Tokyo 1964, Mexico 1968, Munich 1972)
Natalia Rahman – sports shooter, Melbourne 2006 Commonwealth Games gold medallist
Blake 'Bilko' Williams – motocross rider and freestyle motocross champion
Brad Williams – cricketer, fast bowler with the Australian national cricket team from 2003-current
Bailey Wright – soccer player with the British Championship Preston North End Football Club and the Australian national soccer team at the 2014 FIFA World Cup

Australian rules

Ian Bremner - a former Australian rules footballer who represented Collingwood and Hawthorn in the Victorian Football League (VFL) during the 1960s and 1970s. 
Dermott Brereton – player with Hawthorn Football Club from 1982 to 1992, Sydney Football Club 1994, and Collingwood Football Club 1995. AFL Hall of Fame inductee and television presenter on Getaway
Nathan Burke – player with St Kilda Football Club from 1987 to 2003 and Captain from 1996 to 2000
Gary Colling – player with St Kilda Football Club from 1968 to 1981 and Captain in 1978 Gary was also a school teacher at then Baxter Technical School, now known as Mt Erin Secondary College.
 Jack Dyer – player known as "Captain Blood" with Richmond Football Club from 1931 to 1949, Captain 1941–49 and Coach 1941–52, AFL Hall of Fame inductee (retired to Frankston) 
 Leigh Gloury – player with Melbourne Football Club from 1953 to 1954
Russell Greene – player with St Kilda Football Club from 1974 to 1979 and Hawthorn Football Club from 1980 to 1988, won the Leigh Matthews Trophy in 1984
Robert Harvey – player with St Kilda Football Club from 1988 to 2008, Captain from 2001 to 2002 and twice Brownlow Medallist (1997 & 1998)
Craig Jacotine – player with Collingwood Football Club from 1999 to 2000. Choosing education over football, Craig was delisted at the end of 2000 and now resides Frankston South.
Nathan Lonie – player with Hawthorn Football Club from 2001 to 2005 and Port Adelaide Football Club from 2006 to 2008
Ryan Lonie – player with Collingwood Football Club from 2001 to 2008
Leigh Matthews AM – player with Hawthorn Football Club from 1969 to 1985, celebrated coach, AFL Hall of Fame inductee and named the Player of the Century
Kelvin Moore – player with Hawthorn Football Club from 1970 to 1984 and AFL Hall of Fame inductee
Travis Payze – player with St Kilda Football Club from 1966 to 1974 and club President from 1986 to 1993
Grant Thomas – player with St Kilda Football Club from 1978 to 1983 and Coach from 2001 to 2006
Stuart Trott – player with St Kilda Football Club from 1967 to 1974 and Captain in 1973, went on to play for Hawthorn Football Club briefly from 1975 to 1977

References 

Frankston
 List
Frankston people
Frankston